Mario Konrad (born 22 January 1983) is an Austrian footballer. He plays for Austrian Regionalliga East club SV Leobendorf.

Playing career
Austrian striker Konrad made his way into professional football after spells as a youth player at both hometown club SK Rapid Vienna and VFB Stuttgart. In 2001, he signed a professional contract with SC Schwarz-Weiß Bregenz, a club in Austria's regional divisions based on Lake Constance. After a successful three years in Bregenz, Konrad agreed to terms with Styrian outfit Kapfenberger SV who were at the time in the second tier of Austrian football. Another move followed just 12 months later as Konrad enjoyed a two-year stay at the much more renowned LASK Linz. A short stint in Germany with SpVgg Unterhaching ensued, before Konrad made the short trip south back to his native Austria to play for another Vorarlberg side SCR Altach.

At the start of the 2009/10 season, Konrad made a surprise move to Austria's biggest and best supported club SK Rapid Vienna, scoring his first goal for the Green & Whites against SK Austria Kärnten. Konrad struggled during his time at the Gerhard Hanappi Stadium and after having failed to convince during his 15 appearances was subsequently banished to train with the reserves. Having failed to ship him out in the close season, Rapid kept Konrad's registration throughout the 2010/2011 season, in which he failed to make an appearance. At the end of the season Konrad finally found an escape route in the shape of regional league outfit SV Horn, with whom he achieved promotion to the second tier in his first season.

Despite having enjoyed moderate success at Horn, Konrad made the surprise move to FC Liefering, a reserve side/feeder club for FC Red Bull Salzburg.

References

External links

1983 births
Footballers from Vienna
Living people
Austrian footballers
Association football forwards
SW Bregenz players
Kapfenberger SV players
LASK players
SpVgg Unterhaching players
SC Rheindorf Altach players
SK Rapid Wien players
SV Horn players
FC Liefering players
First Vienna FC players
Austrian Football Bundesliga players
2. Liga (Austria) players
Oberliga (football) players
Regionalliga players
Austrian Regionalliga players
Austrian Landesliga players
Austrian expatriate footballers
Expatriate footballers in Germany
Austrian expatriate sportspeople in Germany